Casiopea Live is the third live album and first live video by Casiopea, released in 1985. This is also Casiopea's 14th album overall.

Track listing

Personnel 
CASIOPEA are
Issei Noro - Electric guitar
Minoru Mukaiya - Keyboards
Tetsuo Sakurai - Electric Bass
Akira Jimbo - Drums

Production 
 Producer - Shinichi Tohyama

Release history

External links
 LaserDisc Database Casiopea: Live in Concert (1985) SM035-3328

CD:32XA-48 

Casiopea Live is the third live album by Casiopea, released in 1985. This is also Casiopea's 14th album overall.

Track listing

Personnel 
CASIOPEA are
Issei Noro - Electric guitar
Minoru Mukaiya - Keyboards
Tetsuo Sakurai - Electric Bass
Akira Jimbo - Drums

Production 
 Producer - Shinichi Tohyama
Remastering engineer - Kouji Suzuki (2016)

Release history

External links

Full Live 
Aside from Casiopea Perfect Live II, all Casiopea lives officially released are cut. 

Some songs are missing from the official release, some are not in the right order and some are shorter. Since this live featured dancers, the ending of "Eyes of the Mind" is heavily extended.

References 

1985 live albums
Casiopea live albums
Alfa Records live albums
1985 video albums